White Feathers is the debut album by English new wave band Kajagoogoo, released on 18 April 1983 by EMI Records. The album contains their most successful single, "Too Shy", a UK No. 1 hit in February 1983, as well as two other UK Top 20 hits: "Ooh to Be Ah" and "Hang on Now".

Background
White Feathers was produced by Nick Rhodes, of Duran Duran, and Colin Thurston, who was Duran Duran's producer at the time. The sole exception is the self-titled instrumental track "Kajagoogoo", produced by Tim Palmer and the band. This track song was featured as the opening title song in the 1984 John Hughes movie Sixteen Candles.

After the band was featured on the VH1 program Bands Reunited in 2003, renewed interest in Kajagoogoo prompted the band's original label EMI to re-issue White Feathers on CD in the UK for the first time in 2004 (although it had been available on CD in Japan and the U.S. since 1993). Originally containing 10 tracks, the 2004 version of the album contained eight bonus tracks, including four B-sides and four remixes, two of which are of "Too Shy" (both an extended and instrumental version).

Track listing
Music by Kajagoogoo. Lyrics credited below.

Side one
 "White Feathers" (Nick Beggs) – 3:28
 "Too Shy" (Beggs, Limahl) – 3:44
 "Lies and Promises" (Beggs, Limahl) – 2:51
 "Magician Man" (Limahl) – 3:42
 "Kajagoogoo" (Instrumental) – 3:10

Side two
 "Ooh to Be Ah" (Limahl) – 3:14
 "Ergonomics" (Beggs, Limahl) – 3:12
 "Hang on Now" (Beggs, Limahl) – 3:26
 "This Car Is Fast" (Limahl) – 3:32
 "Frayo" (Limahl) – 4:15

The American and Canadian editions have a resequenced running order: "Too Shy" opens side one, and on side two, "Ergonomics" is moved to track 4.

2004 CD bonus tracks
"Too Shy" (Instrumental Mix) (Beggs, Limahl) – 4:01
 "Take Another View" (Kajagoogoo) – 4:33
 "Interview Rooms" (Beggs) – 3:24
 "Animal Instincts" (Beggs) – 2:39
 "Introduction" (Beggs, Limahl) – 5:09
 "Too Shy" (Midnight Mix) (Beggs, Limahl) – 5:27
 "Ooh to Be Ah" (The Construction Mix) (Limahl) – 6:37
 "Hang on Now" (Extended Version) (Beggs, Limahl) – 6:19

There are two 12-inch mixes of "Too Shy", both confusingly called the "Midnight Mix" (although sometimes erroneously billed as "12-inch Extended Version"). The UK version has a running time of about 5:27, while the American version, available on the compilations Too Shy: The Singles and More (1993) and Maximum 80's (2000), is around 5:44. The 2011 So80's compilation contains both mixes.

Personnel
Kajagoogoo
Limahl – lead vocals
Steve Askew – guitars
Stuart Neale – keyboards, programming, backing vocals
Nick Beggs – bass guitar, Chapman Stick, backing vocals
Jez Strode – drums, percussion

Technical
Colin Thurston – co-producer, engineer
Nick Rhodes – co-producer
Tim Palmer – co-producer ("Kajagoogoo", "Animal Instincts", "Introduction"), engineer ("Kajagoogoo", "Animal Instincts")
Kajagoogoo – co-producer ("Kajagoogoo", "Animal Instincts")
Femi Jaya – producer ("Take Another View")
Shoot That Tiger! – art direction, design
Ian Hooton – front cover photography
Eric Watson – liner sheet photography
Toni & Guy – hair
Nigel Reeve – reissue project coordination
Kathy Bryan – mastering
Hugh Gilmour/The Red Room – re-issue design

Charts

Weekly charts

Year-end charts

References

External links
 White Feathers album
 KajaFax - The Officially Approved Limahl & Kajagoogoo Community & Fan Club
 Unofficial Limahl & Kajagoogoo YouTube video archives

1983 debut albums
Kajagoogoo albums
Albums produced by Colin Thurston
Albums produced by Tim Palmer
EMI Records albums